I Made a Place is a 2019 album by Bonnie "Prince" Billy, the stage name of American indie folk musician Will Oldham. It was released to positive critical reception.

Recording
The songs that make up I Made a Place were recorded by Oldham with producer Mark Nevers; the duo originally considered making a Ramones cover album but after the death of David Berman, they went back to original songs. These compositions were recorded with no intention on releasing an album.

Critical reception

The editorial staff of AllMusic gave the album 3.5 out of five stars, with reviewer Fred Thomas concluding that it is made up of solid songwriting but stating, "While no less emotionally dense than that or any of Oldham's work, I Made a Place feels less intense, and even fun by comparison". Kitty Empire of The Observer gave it four out of five stars, for the moving quality of Oldham's lyrics and in particular his investigation of solitude. Sal Sodomsky of Pitchfork awarded the album 7.1 out of 10 for what he wrote was one of Oldham's most "complicated" albums. Stereogum named it album of the week, with Tom Breihan calling the songs "security-blanket music, and it's lovely".

Accolades

Track listing
All songs written by Bonnie "Prince" Billy
"New Memory Box" – 3:01
"Dream Awhile" – 3:31
"The Devil's Throat" – 3:33
"Look Backward on Your Future, Look Forward to Your Past" – 3:55
"I Have Made a Place" – 3:39
"Squid Eye" – 2:46
"You Know the One" – 3:37
"This Is Far from Over" – 2:46
"Nothing Is Busted" – 4:33
"Mama Mama" – 2:32
"The Glow, Pt. 3" – 3:22
"Thick Air" – 2:41
"Building a Fire" – 3:38

Personnel
Bonnie "Prince" Billy – guitar, vocals
Jacob Duncan – woodwind, keyboards
Chris Greenwell – recording
Mike Hyman – drums
Danny Kiely – bass guitar
Cheyenne Mize – fiddle
Mark Nevers – production
Dan Osborn – layout
Chris Rodahaffer – banjo, pedal steel guitar
Carl Saff – mastering
Nathan Salsburg – guitar
Joan Shelley – vocals

Charts

References

External links
Page from Drag City

2019 albums
Will Oldham albums
Drag City (record label) albums
Domino Recording Company albums